Vietnam is competing at the 2013 World Aquatics Championships in Barcelona, Spain between 19 July and 4 August 2013.

Swimming

Vietnam qualified there quota places for the following swimming events.

Men

Women

References

External links
Barcelona 2013 Official Site

Nations at the 2013 World Aquatics Championships
2013 in Vietnamese sport
Vietnam at the World Aquatics Championships